"Sweet Illusion" is a song written and recorded by Junior Campbell in April 1973 as a follow up single to "Hallelujah Freedom", which had seen success in the UK Singles Chart at the end of the previous year.

The recording took place at Decca Studio 2 in London and featured Campbell on lead vocal, piano, guitar & electric piano,  with Ray Duffy on drums and percussion, Rick West of The Tremeloes on bass, and Pete Zorn on flute.

The backing vocals were performed by Ruby James, Irene Chanter and Campbell. The recording was engineered by John Burns - Decca staff engineer. The orchestral accompaniment consisted of 12 violins, 4 violas, 4 celli, (Strings) and 3 trumpets, 2 tenor trombones and 1 bass trombone (brass). The arrangement was by Campbell himself. 

"Sweet Illusion" was released on 27 April 1973 on Deram DM 387 entering the UK Singles Chart on 2 June 1973. The record spent nine weeks on the chart reaching number 15 position.

References

Roberts, David. Guinness Book of British Hit Singles & Albums. Guinness World Records Limited. 20th revised edition. (Jun 2007). 
 Liner notes Second Time Around - 2001 - Sanctuary Records CMDDD 398

1973 songs
Songs written by Junior Campbell
Deram Records singles
1973 singles